Crimi is a surname. Notable people with the name include:

Alfred D. Crimi (1900–1994), Italian-American painter
Giulio Crimi (1885–1939), Italian opera singer 
Marco Crimi (born 1990), Italian footballer
Vito Crimi (born 1972), Italian politician

Italian-language surnames